Georgi Markov (born 12 March 1978 in Burgas) is a retired male weightlifter from Bulgaria. He won the silver medal in the men's lightweight division (– 69 kg) at the 2000 Summer Olympics, behind compatriot Galabin Boevski. He set one world record in the lightweight snatch in 2000.

Markov tested positive for a steroid in 2008, and therefore Bulgaria's weightlifting federation withdrew its team from the 2008 Summer Olympics.

References 

1978 births
Living people
Bulgarian male weightlifters
Olympic weightlifters of Bulgaria
Weightlifters at the 2000 Summer Olympics
Olympic silver medalists for Bulgaria
World record setters in weightlifting
Bulgarian sportspeople in doping cases
Doping cases in weightlifting
Sportspeople from Burgas
Olympic medalists in weightlifting
Medalists at the 2000 Summer Olympics
European Weightlifting Championships medalists
World Weightlifting Championships medalists
20th-century Bulgarian people
21st-century Bulgarian people